Crataegus turkestanica, the Turkestan hawthorn, is a species of hawthorn found in Central Asia,  Afghanistan and Iran. They are typically found in association with Juglans regia. Some authorities have it as a synonym of Crataegus pseudoheterophylla subsp. turkestanica.

References

turkestanica
Plants described in 1939